José Rodolfo Reyes Machado (born February 25, 1988, in Gómez Palacio, Durango) is a former professional Mexican footballer who last played for Correcaminos UAT.

References

Correcaminos UAT footballers
1988 births
Living people
Mexican footballers
People from Gómez Palacio, Durango
Association football forwards
Footballers from Durango
21st-century Mexican people